Santarpio's Pizza is a restaurant in the neighborhood of East Boston, Massachusetts, United States. It was originally established in 1903 as a bakery. Frank Santarpio began selling pizza there three decades later. A landmark to locals and a destination for visitors, the eatery is primarily known for its Boston-style pizza, which it has served at its Chelsea Street location since 1933. One Boston Globe reporter said of the establishment that "the average New Englander's only knowledge of East Boston is the sign for Santarpio's Pizza that can be seen from the highway on the way to the airport."

History
Still owned and operated by the Santarpio family, the restaurant was one of the original pizzerias that opened to cater to Italian Americans who had emigrated to East Boston and the surrounding neighborhoods. Besides several varieties of pizza, Santarpio's menu offers only four other items: barbecued lamb, steak tips, chicken, and sausage.

The eatery refused to fill an order from the film My Best Friend's Girl when the production crew insisted that the 75-pie order be ready in an hour. Glenn Carlton has baked bread and prepared dough for the pizzas at Santarpio's for 30 years. Lennie Timpone, whose mother was a Santarpio, was born in 1945 and has worked at the Chelsea Street location his entire life.

Honors and awards
 Food & Wine named it in their list of best pizza places in the US.
 In 2012, Santarpio's was featured on Bizarre Foods America.

References

External links
Official website

1903 establishments in Massachusetts
Barbecue restaurants in the United States
Food and drink companies established in 1903
East Boston
Italian-American culture in Boston
Pizzerias in the United States
Restaurants established in 1933
Restaurants in Boston